Margaret Alford was a pioneering woman classicist who achieved a First at Cambridge University in 1887, a time when women were not formally awarded degrees. She spent more than two decades teaching at schools and universities, while publishing and editing many books. She specialised in Latin prose, particularly the works of Livy, Tacitus and Cicero, an area almost entirely dominated by male scholars.

Education
Margaret Alford was taught ancient Greek from an early age by her father, Bradley Hurt Alford, a Church of England clergyman. She attended Maida Vale High School, a girls' day school in London. She  spent two terms at Bedford College, London as a Trustees Scholar, before transferring to Girton College, Cambridge, where she graduated with a First in 1887 (although women were not awarded degrees from Cambridge at that time). Here JP Postgate, the well-known supporter of women in higher education, supervised her Latin prose composition. Her older sister, Dorothy (later Banks) studied Natural Sciences at the same college. Punch magazine noted, and satirised, the success of women in Classics at Cambridge at the time, and of the two women's colleges Girton and Newnham; Alford was mentioned as 'a Classical First' in a verse called The Ladies' Year

Career
 1891-1917 - Visiting Lecturer at Girton College
 1894-1919 - Visiting Lecturer at Westfield College, London
 1904-1909 - Head of Department of Latin at Bedford College, London
 1918-1943 - Managed the periodicals for the joint Societies (Hellenic and Roman), and served on the council for the Hellenic Society

During the period of 1942-1945, she served as the only woman on the editorial staff of the Oxford Latin Dictionary. Alford worked on other books including Liddell-Scott-Jones's Greek-English Lexicon, Lampe's Patristic Greek Lexicon, and index to H. M. Allen's edition of the letters of Erasmus (Opus Epistolarum Des. Erasmi Roterdami)

Awards and honours
 1943 - Elected to Honorary Fellowship of Girton
 1943 - Awarded with an honorary MA from the University of Oxford

Published works
Throughout her career as a university lecturer, Alford published a number of books, mostly commentaries on Latin texts:
 Livy, Book V (London: Macmillan Elementary Classics, 1892)
 Latin prose for translation: for the use of higher forms in school and of students working for pass degrees (London: Macmillan & Co., 1902)
 Versions of Latin Passages for Translation (London: Macmillan, 1910)
 Tacitus, Histories, Book I (University of London Press, 1912)
 Cicero, Letters to Atticus, Book II (London: Macmillan Red, 1929)
 Livy, Book II (London: Macmillan Elementary Classics, 1933)

Further reading
 Rosie Wyles and Edith Hall (eds), 2014, Unsealing the Fountain: Pioneering Female Philologists from the Renaissance to the Twentieth Century, Oxford University Press
 Stray, C. (ed.), 1999. Classics in 19th and 20th century Cambridge, Cambridge University Press

References

English classical scholars
Women classical scholars
Scholars of Latin literature
People associated with Bedford College, London
Alumni of Girton College, Cambridge
1868 births
1951 deaths
Place of birth missing